Dennen may refer to:

Surnamed "Dennen"
 Brett Dennen (born 1979), U.S. singer-songwriter
 Barry Dennen (1938–2017), U.S. actor, singer, writer
 Alfie Dennen, UK technologist
 George E. Dennen (1884–1966), American reporter and politician
 Lyle Dennen, UK Anglican priest
Other
 Camp Dennen, found on the shores of Hedges Pond (Plymouth, Massachusetts)

See also 
 Deneen
 Dineen
 Dinneen
 Dannen